Parathlibops is a genus of beetles in the family Carabidae, containing the following species:

 Parathlibops abbreviatus (K. B. M. J. Heller, 1923)
 Parathlibops abramovi Fedorenko, 2016
 Parathlibops alveolatus Fedorenko, 2016
 Parathlibops bakukong Bulirsch & Anichtchenko, 2018
 Parathlibops bulirschi Fedorenko, 2016
 Parathlibops cavipennis Fedorenko, 2016
 Parathlibops crenatus (Chaudoir, 1863)
 Parathlibops cylindronotus Fedorenko, 2016
 Parathlibops dohrni (Chaudoir, 1863)
 Parathlibops filiformis (Andrewes, 1929)
 Parathlibops glaber (Andrewes, 1929)
 Parathlibops inexpectatus Bulirsch & Anichtchenko, 2018
 Parathlibops integricollis (K. B. M. J. Heller, 1916)
 Parathlibops intermedius (K. B. M. J. Heller, 1921)
 Parathlibops minor (K. B. M. J. Heller, 1916)
 Parathlibops nepalensis Fedorenko, 2016
 Parathlibops omega (K. B. M. J. Heller, 1899)
 Parathlibops panayensis Bulirsch & Anichtchenko, 2018
 Parathlibops paviei (Lesne, 1896)
 Parathlibops puncticollis (Gestro, 1883)
 Parathlibops punctipennis Fedorenko, 2016
 Parathlibops wittmeri Casale, 1980

References

Scaritinae